Proportional representation (PR) refers to a type of electoral system under which subgroups of an electorate are reflected proportionately in the elected body. The concept applies mainly to political divisions (political parties) among voters. The essence of such systems is that all votes cast - or almost all votes cast - contribute to the result and are effectively used to help elect someone—not just a bare plurality, or (exclusively) the majority—and that the system produces mixed, balanced representation reflecting how votes are cast. 

In the context of voting systems, PR means that the seats in an assembly are allocated in proportion to the vote share each party receives. In systems that don't involve parties, PR ensures that each successful candidate is elected by a roughly equal amount of voters. 

The term "Proportional representation" may also be used to mean fair representation by population as applied to states, regions etc. However, representation being proportional in terms of population size are not considered to make an electoral system proportional the way the term is usually used. For example, the US House of Representatives has 435 members, who each represent a roughly equal number of people and each state is allocated a number of members in accordance with its population size, thus producing fair representation by population. But members of the House are elected in first-past-the-post elections: first-past-the-post is not proportional by vote share as it has only one winner. Meanwhile, PR electoral systems are typically proportional to both population (seats per district) and vote share (typically party-wise). The European Parliament gives each member state a number of seats roughly based on its population size (see degressive proportionality) and further, in each member state the election must be held using a PR system (with proportional results based on vote share).  

The most widely used families of PR electoral systems are party-list PR, used in 85 countries, mixed-member PR (MMP), used in 7 countries, and the single transferable vote (STV), used in Ireland, Malta and Australian Senate. All PR systems require multi-member voting districts, meaning votes are pooled to elect multiple representatives at once. Pooling may be done in various multi-member districts (in STV and most list PR systems) or in single countrywide - so called at-large - district (in other list-PR systems). A country-wide pooling of votes to elect more than a hundred members is used in Angola, for example. For large districts, party-list PR is more often used. A purely candidate-based PR system, STV, has never been used to elect more than 21 in a single contest to this point in history. Some PR systems use at-large pooling or regional pooling in conjunction with single-member districts (such as the New Zealand MMP and the Scottish additional member system), others use at-large pooling in conjunction with multi-member districts (Denmark). In these cases pooling is used to allocated the so called leveling seats (top-up) to compensate for the disproportional results produced in single-member districts using FPTP (MMP/AMS) or to polish the fairness produced in multi-member districts using list PR (Denmark's MMP). PR systems that achieve the highest levels of proportionality tend to use as general pooling as possible (typically country-wide) or districts with large numbers of seats.  

Due to various factors, perfect proportionality is rarely achieved under PR systems. The use of electoral thresholds (in list-PR or MMP), small districts with few seats in each (in STV or list-PR), absence or insufficient number of leveling seats (in list-PR, MMP or AMS) may produce disproportionality. Other sources are electoral tactics that may be used in certain system, such as party splitting in some MMP systems. Nonetheless, PR systems approximate proportionality much better than other systems and are more resistant to gerrymandering and other forms of manipulation.

Basics 
To achieve their intended effect, Proportional electoral systems always have to allow for multiple winners.  There needs to be more than one seat in each district or some form of pooling of votes. Elections for a single president cannot be based on proportional representation, but a legislative body (assembly, parliament) may be elected proportionally. 

In the European Parliament for instance, each member state has a number of seats that is (roughly) proportional to its population, enabling geographical proportional representation. For these elections all EU countries also must use a proportional electoral system (enabling political proportional representation): When n% of the electorate support a particular political party or set of candidates as their favorite, then roughly n% of seats are allotted to that party or those candidates. All PR aim to provide some form of equal representation for votes, but may differ in their approaches on how they achieve this.

How party-list PR works 

Party list PR is the most commonly used version of proportional representation. Voters cast votes for parties and each party is allocated seats based on its party share.

Some party-list PR systems use overall country-wide vote counts; others count vote shares in separate parts of the country and allocate seats in each part according to that specific vote count. Some use both.

List PR involves parties in the election process. Voters do not primarily vote for candidates (persons), but for electoral lists (or party lists), which are lists of candidates that parties put forward. The mechanism that allocates seats to the parties/lists is how these systems achieve proportionality. Once this is done, the candidates who take the seats are based on the order in which they appear on the list. This is the basic, closed list version of list PR.

An example election where the assembly has 200 seats to be filled is presented below. Every voter votes for the list created by their favourite party and the results of the election are as follows (popular vote). Under party-list PR, every party gets a number of seats proportional to their share of the popular vote.

This is done by a proportional formula/method, for example the D'Hondt method (also called the Jefferson method) - these are the same methods that may be used to allocate seats for geographic proportional representation (for example, how many seats each states gets in the US House of Representatives). Votes and seats often cannot be mathematically perfectly allocated, so some amount of rounding has to be done. The various methods deal with this in different ways, although the difference is reduced if there are many seats ― for example, if the whole country is one district. Party list PR is also more complicated in reality than in the example, as countries often use more than one district, multiple tiers (e.g. local, regional and national), open lists or an electoral threshold.

 How the single transferable vote (STV) works 

The single transferable vote is an older method than party-list PR, and it does not need to formally involve parties in the election process. Instead of parties putting forward ordered lists of candidates from which winners are drawn in order, candidates run by name and it is voters themselves who rank the candidates. This is done using a preferential ballot. The ranking is used to instruct election officials of how the vote should be used in case it is placed on an un-electable candidate or on an elected candidate. Each voter casts one vote and the district used elects multiple members (more than one, usually 3 to 7). Because parties play no role in the vote count, STV may be used for nonpartisan elections, such as the city council of Cambridge, Massachusetts. A large proportion of the votes cast are used to actually elect someone so the result is mixed and balanced with no one voting block taking much more than its due share of the seats. Where party labels are indicated, proportionality party-wise is noticeable.

Counting votes under STV is more complicated than First-past-the-post voting, but the following example shows how the vote count is performed and how proportionality is achieved in a district with 3 seats. In reality, districts need to be larger than that to achieve strict proportionality. The risk though is that if the number of seats is larger than say 10 seats, the ballot will be so large as to be inconvenient and voters may find it difficult to rank the many candidates. (Note that in many STV systems voters are not required to mark more choices than is desired. Even if all voters marked only one preference, the resulting representation would be more balanced than under single-winner FPTP.) 

Under STV, an amount that guarantees election is set. This is called the quota. Specifically the Droop quota is used. In this example, a candidate who earns more than 25% of the vote is declared elected.  Note that it is only possible for 3 candidates to each get that quota. 

In the first count, the first preferences (favourite candidates) of all the voters are counted. Any candidates who pass the quota are declared elected. 

Next, the votes the candidates received above the quota (surplus votes that they did not need to get elected) are transferred to the next preferences of the voters who voted for them. We start with Jane Doe's surplus. For the example we suppose that all voters of Jane Doe prefer John Citizen as their second choice (as he is also from Party A). Based on this we reallocate the votes and find that John Citizen has passed the quota and so is declared elected to the 3rd and last seat that we had to fill. (Even if we assume that Fred Rubble's surplus would have gone to Mary Hill, the vote transfer plus Hill's original votes would not add up to quota. Party B did not have two quotas of votes so was not due two seats, while Party A was.) (It is possible in realistic STV elections for a candidate to win without quota if they are still in the running when the field of candidates is thinned to the number of remaining open seats. But that was not necessary in this case.)

The district result is balanced party-wise. 
No one party took all the seats as frequently happens under FPTP or other non-proportional voting systems.
The result is fair -- the most popular party took two seats; the less popular party took just one.
The most popular candidate(s) in each party won the party's seat(s).
Eighty-one percent of the voters saw their first choice elected. Fifteen percent of them saw both their first and second choices elected.
Every voter had satisfaction of seeing someone of the party they support elected in the district. 

 How mixed-member proportional representation (MMP) works 

Mixed Member Proportional Representation combines election of district members with election of additional members as compensatory top-up.

Often MMDP systems use single-member districts to elect district members. (Denmark uses multi-member districts in its MMP system). MMP with SMDs is described here.

The mixed-member proportional system combines single member plurality voting (SMP), also known as first-past-the-post (FPTP), with party-list PR in a way that the overall result of the election is supposed to be proportional. The voter may vote for a district candidate as well as a party. The main idea behind MMP is compensation, meaning that the list-PR seat allocation is not independent of the results of the district level voting. First-past-the-post is a single winner system and cannot be proportional (winner-takes-all), so these disproportionalities are compensated by the party-list component.

A simple, yet common version of MMP has as many list-PR seats as there are single-member districts. In the example it can be seen, as is often the case in reality, that the results of the district elections are highly disproportional: large parties typically win more seats than they should proportionally, but there is also random-ness - a party that receives more votes than another party might not win more seats than the other. Any such dis-proportionality produced by the district elections is addressed, where possible, by the allocation of the compensatory additional members.

MMP gives only as many compensatory seats to a party as they need to have the number of seats of each party be proportional. Another way to say this is that MMP focuses on making the final outcome proportional.

 Differences to parallel voting 
Compare the MMP example to parallel voting. Parallel voting is a mixed-member majoritarian system. Here the party-list PR seat allocation is independent of the district results, meaning that there is no compensation (no regard to how the district seats were filled). The popular vote, the number of districts won by each party, and the number of districts and party-list PR seats are all the same as in the MMP example above, yet the total number of seats is different.

The overall results are not proportional, although they are more balanced and fair than most single-winner First past the post elections. Parallel voting is mostly semi-proportional. Mixed system is the most proportional if the additional members are allocated in compensatory form. 

There are many versions of MMP in use. Some use only a single vote; in some, voters cast two votes, one for a local candidate and one for a party. Some allocate compensatory seats to best losers; others allocate according to party lists. Some use levelling seats to compensate for potential overhang seats; others don't. Most impose an electoral threshold in order for a party to be eligible for any additional seats; some allow parties that elect one or more district seats to be eligible for additional seats even if its party share is below the threshold. Any barrier to access to the additional seats may produce wasted votes and dis-proportionality in the final result.

As well, there is single non-transferable vote, which is also semi-proportional. It has the advantage that parties play no direct role in elections and voters do not need to mark ranked votes. Each voter casts one vote for a candidate and as many candidates win by plurality as the number of seats in the district. Due to each voter casting just one vote, as in STV, and each district electing multiple members, as in STV, mixed representation is produced in each district and overall rough proportionality more or less. Without transferable votes, more votes are wasted than under STV.

Advantages and disadvantages
The case for a Single Transferrable Vote system, a form of proportional representation, was made by John Stuart Mill in his 1861 essay Considerations on Representative Government:

Mill's essay does not support Party-based Proportional Representation and may indicate a distaste for the ills of Party-based systems in saying:Of all modes in which a national representation can possibly be constituted, this one affords the best security for the intellectual qualifications desirable in the representatives. At present, by universal admission, it is becoming more and more difficult for any one who has only talents and character to gain admission into the House of Commons. The only persons who can get elected are those who possess local influence, or make their way by lavish expenditure, or who, on the invitation of three or four tradesmen or attorneys, are sent down by one of the two great parties from their London clubs, as men whose votes the party can depend on under all circumstances.Many political theorists agree with Mill that in a representative democracy the representatives should represent all substantial segments of society but want reform rather than abolition of direct local community representation in the legislature.

STV and the Additional-Member system both produce local area representation and overall PR through mixed, balanced representation at the district level.

Fairness

PR tries to resolve the unfairness of majoritarian and plurality voting systems where the largest parties receive an "unfair" seat bonus and smaller parties are disadvantaged, always under-represented, and on occasion win no representation at all (Duverger's law). Under FPTP, an established party in UK elections has been elected to majority government with as little as 35% of votes (2005 UK general election). In certain Canadian elections, majority governments have been formed by parties with the support of under 40% of votes cast (2011 Canadian election, 2015 Canadian election). If turnout levels in the electorate are less than 60%, such outcomes allow a party to form a majority government by convincing as few as one quarter of the electorate to vote for it.  In the 2005 UK election, for example, the Labour Party under Tony Blair won a comfortable parliamentary majority with the votes of only 21.6% of the total electorate.  Such misrepresentation has been criticized as "no longer a question of 'fairness' but of elementary rights of citizens". 

However, intermediate PR systems with a high electoral threshold, or other features that reduce proportionality, are not necessarily much fairer: in the 2002 Turkish general election, using an open list system with a 10% threshold, 46% of votes were wasted. The other 54 percent of the votes did receive fair level of representation, though. Under First past the post, a third or so of members are elected with less than half the votes cast in their district, the majority in such districts not getting any local representation and with no levelling seats getting no representation at all.

Plurality/majoritarian systems also benefit regional parties that win many seats in the region where they have a strong following but have little support nationally, while other parties with national support that is not concentrated in specific districts, like the Greens, win few or no seats.  An example is the Bloc Québécois in Canada that won 52 seats in the 1993 federal election, all in Quebec, on 13.5%  of the national vote, while the Progressive Conservatives collapsed to two seats on 16% spread nationally. The Conservative party although strong nationally had had very strong regional support in the West but in this election its supporters in the West turned to the Reform party (another regional party), which won all its seats west of Ontario, winning most of its seats west of Saskatchewan.  Similarly, in the 2015 UK General Election, the Scottish National Party gained 56 seats, all in Scotland, with a 4.7% share of the national vote while the UK Independence Party, with 12.6%, gained only a single seat.

Representation of minor parties
The use of multiple-member districts enables a greater variety of candidates to be elected.  Having more representatives per district and lowering the percentage of votes required for election allows more minor parties to gain representation. It has been argued that in emerging democracies, inclusion of minorities in the legislature can be essential for social stability and to consolidate the democratic process.

Critics, on the other hand, claim this can give extreme parties a foothold in parliament, sometimes cited as a cause for the collapse of the Weimar government.  With very low thresholds, very small parties can act as "king-makers", holding larger parties to ransom during coalition discussions.  The example of Israel is often quoted, but these problems can be limited, as in the modern German Bundestag, by the introduction of higher threshold limits for a party to gain parliamentary representation (which in turn increases the number of wasted votes).

Another criticism is that the dominant parties in plurality/majoritarian systems, often looked on as "coalitions" or as "broad churches", can fragment under PR as the election of candidates from smaller groups becomes possible. Israel, Brazil, and Italy (until 1993) are examples.  However, research shows, in general, there is only a small increase in the number of parties in parliament (although small parties have larger representation) under PR.

Open list systems and STV, the only prominent PR system which does not require political parties, enable independent candidates to be elected.  In Ireland, on average, about six independent candidates have been elected each parliament.
This can lead to a situation where forming a Parliamentary majority requires support of one or more of these independent representatives. In some cases these independents have positions that are closely aligned with the governing party and it hardly matters. The Irish Government formed after the 2016 election even included independent representatives in the cabinet of a minority government. In others, the electoral platform is entirely local and addressing this is a price for support.

Coalitions
The election of smaller parties gives rise to one of the principal objections to PR systems, that they almost always result in coalition governments.

Supporters of PR see coalitions as an advantage, forcing compromise between parties to form a coalition at the centre of the political spectrum, and so leading to continuity and stability.  Opponents counter that with many policies compromise is not possible. Neither can many policies be easily positioned on the left-right spectrum (for example, the environment). So policies are horse-traded during coalition formation, with the consequence that voters have no way of knowing which policies will be pursued by the government they elect; voters have less influence on governments.  Also, coalitions do not necessarily form at the centre, and small parties can have excessive influence, supplying a coalition with a majority only on condition that a policy or policies favoured by few voters is/are adopted. Most importantly, the ability of voters to vote a party in disfavour out of power is curtailed.

All these disadvantages, the PR opponents contend, are avoided by two-party plurality systems.  Coalitions are rare; the two dominant parties necessarily compete at the centre for votes, so that governments are more reliably moderate; the strong opposition necessary for proper scrutiny of government is assured; and governments remain sensitive to public sentiment because they can be, and are, regularly voted out of power.  However, this is not necessarily so; a two-party system can result in a "drift to extremes", hollowing out the centre, or, at least, in one party drifting to an extreme. The opponents of PR also contend that coalition governments created under PR are less stable, and elections are more frequent. Italy is an often-cited example with many governments composed of many different coalition partners. However, Italy is unusual in that both its houses can make a government fall, whereas other PR nations have either just one house or have one of their two houses be the core body supporting a government. Italy's current parallel voting system is not PR, so Italy is not an appropriate candidate for measuring the stability of PR.

Voter participation
Plurality systems usually result in single-party-majority government because generally fewer parties are elected in large numbers under FPTP compared to PR, and FPTP compresses politics to little more than two-party contests. Relatively few votes in a few of the most finely balanced districts, the "swing seats", are able to swing majority control in the house. Incumbents in less evenly divided districts are invulnerable to slight swings of political mood.  In the UK, for example, about half the constituencies have always elected the same party since 1945; in the 2012 US House elections 45 districts (10% of all districts) were uncontested by one of the two dominant parties.  Voters who know their preferred candidate will not win have little incentive to vote, and even if they do their votes have no effect, although they are still counted in the popular vote calculation.

With PR, there are no "swing seats". Most votes contribute to the election of a candidate, so parties need to campaign in all districts, not just those where their support is strongest or where they perceive most advantage.  This fact in turn encourages parties to be more responsive to voters, producing a more "balanced" ticket by nominating more women and minority candidates.  On average about 8% more women are elected.

Since most votes count, there are fewer "wasted votes", so voters, aware that their vote can make a difference, are more likely to make the effort to vote, and less likely to vote tactically.  Compared to countries with plurality electoral systems, voter turnout improves and the population is more involved in the political process. However, some experts argue that transitioning from plurality to PR only increases voter turnout in geographical areas associated with safe seats under the plurality system; turnout may decrease in areas formerly associated with swing seats.

Gerrymandering
First past the post elections are dependent on the drawing of boundaries of their single-member districts, a process vulnerable to political interference (gerrymandering) even if districts are drawn in such a way as to ensure approximately equal representation.  To compound the problem, boundaries have to be periodically re-drawn to accommodate population changes.  Even apolitically drawn boundaries can unintentionally produce the effect of gerrymandering, reflecting naturally occurring concentrations.

PR systems, due to having larger and fewer multiple-member districts, are less prone to gerrymandering  research suggests five-seat districts or larger are immune to gerrymandering.

Equality of size of multiple-member districts is not important (the number of seats can vary) so districts can be aligned with historical territories of varying sizes such as cities, counties, states or provinces. Later population changes can be accommodated by simply adjusting the number of representatives elected, without having to re-draw boundary.  For example, Professor Mollison in his 2010 plan for STV for the UK divided the country into 143 districts and then allocated varying number of seats to each district (to add up to the existing total of 650 MPs) depending on the number of voters in each but with wide ranges (his five-seat districts include one with 327,000 voters and another with 382,000 voters).  His district boundaries follow historical county and local authority boundaries, yet he achieves more uniform representation than does the Boundary Commission, the body responsible for balancing the UK's first-past-the-post constituency sizes.

Mixed member systems are susceptible to gerrymandering for the local seats that remain a part of such systems. Under parallel voting, a semi-proportional system, there is no compensation for the effects that such gerrymandering might have. Under MMP, the use of compensatory list seats makes gerrymandering less of an issue. However, its effectiveness in this regard depends upon the features of the system, including the size of the regional districts, the relative share of list seats in the total, and opportunities for collusion that might exist. A striking example of how the compensatory mechanism can be undermined can be seen in the 2014 Hungarian parliamentary election, where the leading party, Fidesz, combined gerrymandering and decoy lists, which resulted in a two-thirds parliamentary majority from a 45% vote. This illustrates how certain implementations of mixed systems (if non-compensatory or insufficiently compensatory) can produce moderately proportional outcomes, similar to parallel voting.

Link between constituent and representative
It is generally accepted that a particular advantage of plurality electoral systems such as first past the post, or majoritarian electoral systems such as the alternative vote, is the geographic link between representatives and their constituents.  A notable disadvantage of PR is that, as its multiple-member districts are made larger, this link is weakened.  In party list PR systems without delineated districts, such as the Netherlands and Israel, the geographic link between representatives and their constituents is considered weak, but has shown to play a role for some parties.  Yet with relatively small multiple-member districts, in particular with STV, there are counter-arguments: about 90% of voters can consult a representative they voted for, someone whom they might think more sympathetic to their problem. In such cases it is sometimes argued that constituents and representatives have a closer link; constituents have a choice of representative so they can consult one with particular expertise in the topic at issue.  With multiple-member districts, prominent candidates have more opportunity to be elected in their home constituencies, which they know and can represent authentically. There is less likely to be a strong incentive to parachute them into constituencies in which they are strangers and thus less than ideal representatives.  Mixed-member PR systems incorporate single-member districts to preserve the link between constituents and representatives. However, because up to half the parliamentary seats are list rather than district seats, the districts are necessarily up to twice as large as with a plurality/majoritarian system where all representatives serve single-member districts.

An interesting case occurred in the Netherlands, when "out of the blue" a party for the elderly, the General Elderly Alliance gained six seats in the 1994 election. The other parties had not paid attention, but this made them aware. With the next election, the Party of the Elderly was gone, because the established parties had started to listen to the elderly. Today, a party for older folks, 50PLUS, has established itself in the Netherlands, albeit never with the same high number of seats. This can be seen as an example how geography in itself may not be a good enough reason to establish voting results around it and overturn all other particulars of the voting population. In a sense, voting in districts restricts the voters to a specific geography. Proportional voting follows the exact outcome of all the votes.

Potential lack of balance in presidential systems
In a presidential system, the president is chosen independently from the parliament. As a consequence, it is possible to have a divided government where a parliament and president have opposing views and may want to balance each other's influence. However, the proportional system favors government of coalitions of many smaller parties that require compromising and negotiating topics. As a consequence, these coalitions might have difficulties presenting a united front to counter presidential influence, leading to a lack of balance between these two powers. With a proportionally elected House, a President may strong-arm certain political issues

This issue does not happen in a parliamentary system, where the prime-minister is elected indirectly by the parliament itself. As a consequence, a divided government is impossible. Even if the political views change with time and the prime minister loses their support from parliament, they can be replaced with a motion of no confidence. Effectively, both measures make it impossible to create a divided government.

Attributes of PR systems
District magnitude
Academics agree that the most important influence on proportionality is an electoral district's magnitude, the number of representatives elected from the district. As magnitude increases, proportionality improves. Some scholars recommend for STV voting districts of roughly four to eight seats, which are considered small relative to PR systems in general, which frequently have district magnitudes in the hundreds.

At one extreme, the binomial electoral system used in Chile between 1989 and 2013, a nominally proportional open-list system, features two-member districts. As this system can be expected to result in the election of one candidate from each of the two dominant political blocks in most districts, it is not generally considered proportional.

At the other extreme, where the district encompasses the entire country (and with a low minimum threshold, highly proportionate representation of political parties can result), parties gain by broadening their appeal by nominating more minority and women candidates.

After the introduction of STV in Ireland in 1921, district magnitudes slowly diminished as more and more three-member constituencies were defined, benefiting the dominant Fianna Fáil, until 1979 when an independent boundary commission was established reversing the trend.  In 2010, a parliamentary constitutional committee recommended a minimum magnitude of four. Despite relatively low magnitudes, Ireland has generally experienced highly proportional results.

In the FairVote plan for STV (which FairVote calls choice voting) for the US House of Representatives, three- to five-member super-districts are proposed.

In Professor Mollison's plan for STV in the UK, four- and five-member districts are mostly used, with three and six seat districts used as necessary to fit existing boundaries, and even two and single member districts used where geography dictates.

Electoral threshold
The electoral threshold is the minimum vote required to win one seat. The lower the threshold, the higher the proportion of votes contributing to the election of representatives and the lower the proportion of votes wasted.

All electoral systems have electoral thresholds, either formally defined or the natural threshold, which is the mathematical consequence of the district magnitude and election parameters.

A formal threshold usually requires parties to win a certain percentage of the vote in order to be awarded seats from the party lists.  In Germany and New Zealand (both MMP), the threshold is 5% of the national vote but the threshold is not applied to parties that win a minimum number of constituency seats (three in Germany, one in New Zealand). Turkey defines a threshold of 7%, the Netherlands 0.67%. Israel has raised its threshold from 1% (before 1992) to 1.5% (up to 2004), 2% (in 2006) and 3.25% in 2014. South Africa has no explicit electoral threshold, only a natural threshold ~0.2%. A list of electoral thresholds by country shows a typical electoral threshold for party-list PR is 3-5%.

In STV elections, winning the quota (ballots/(seats+1)plus 1) of votes assures election. Winning the quota in the first count when first preference votes are all that are counted, assures election at that point. However, candidates who receive only half the quota of first preference votes alone may attract good second (and third, etc.) preference support and win election. When this happens, in a six-seat district the effective threshold becomes 7.14% of first preference votes (100/(6+1)/2). Likewise, for a district magnitude of 3, the effective STV electoral threshold would be 12.5 %, still significantly higher than typical party-list PR. 

However success with less than quota cannot be relied on. Sometimes candidates in winning positions in the first count (but who do not have quota) are not elected, being pushed aside during the vote count in favor of other candidates who were initially less popular but have wide support and benefit from vote transfers. The need to attract second preferences tends to promote consensus and to disadvantage extremes. Those who do not have wide support may not benefit greatly from vote transfers so may not be elected if they do not receive quota on first count.

The electoral threshold has different effects on STV than on Party-list PR. For STV the votes for candidates below natural threshold are not wasted, but transferred to the next-indicated choice. For party-list PR a vote for a party below electoral threshold is an unrepresented vote, unless the spare vote system is applied.

Party magnitude
Party magnitude is the number of candidates elected from one party in one district.  As party magnitude increases a more balanced ticket will be more successful, encouraging parties to nominate women and minority candidates for election.

But under STV, nominating too many candidates can be counter-productive, splitting the first-preference votes and allowing the candidates to be eliminated before receiving transferred votes from other parties.  An example of this was identified in a ward in the 2007 Scottish local elections where Labour, putting up three candidates, won only one seat while they might have won two had one of their voters' preferred candidates not stood.  The same effect may have contributed to the collapse of Fianna Fáil in the 2011 Irish general election. But generally in STV contests the transfers of votes allows each party to take roughly its due share of the seats based on vote tallies of the party's candidates and where all the candidates of a party preferred by a voter are eliminated, the vote may be transferred to a candidate of a different party also preferred by the voter.

Others
Other aspects of PR can influence proportionality such as the size of the elected body, the choice of open or closed lists, ballot design, and vote counting methods.

Measuring disproportionality
Exact proportionality has a single unambiguous definition: the seat shares must exactly equal the vote shares, measured as seats-to-votes ratio. When this condition is violated, the allocation is disproportional, and it may be interesting to examine the degree of disproportionality – the degree to which the number of seats won by each party differs from that of a perfectly proportional outcome. This degree does not have a single unambiguous definition. Some common disproportionality indexes are:

 The Loosemore–Hanby index - calculated by subtracting each party's vote share from its seat share, adding up the absolute values (ignoring any negative signs), and dividing by two.
Related to it is the Rae index. It measures the average deviation, while the Loosemore–Hanby index measures the total deviation.
Related to the amount of unrepresented vote, which only measures the difference between votes cast and seats obtained for parties which did not obtain any seat.
 The Gallagher Index - involves squaring the difference between each party's vote share and seat share, and taking the square root of the sum.
 The Sainte-Laguë Index - where the squared discrepancy from ideal seats-to-votes ratio is weighted equally for each voter.

The disproportionality changes from one election to another depending on voter behavior and size of effective electoral threshold, here shown is the unrepresented vote for New Zealand. In 2005 New Zealand general election every party above 1% got seats due to the electoral threshold in New Zealand of at least one seat in first-past-the-post voting, which caused a much lower unrepresented vote compared to the other years.

Different indexes measure different concepts of disproportionality. Some disproportionality concepts have been mapped to social welfare functions.

Disproportionality indexes are sometimes used to evaluate existing and proposed electoral systems. For example, the Canadian Parliament's 2016 Special Committee on Electoral Reform recommended that a system be designed to achieve "a Gallagher score of 5 or less". This indicated a much lower degree of disproportionality than observed in the 2015 Canadian election under first-past-the-post voting, where the Gallagher index was 12.

There are various other measures of proportionality, some of them have software implementation.

The common indexes (Loosemore–Hanby, Gallagher, Sainte-Laguë) do not support ranked voting. An alternative that does support it is the Droop proportionality criterion (DPC). It requires that if, for some set M of candidates, there exist more than k Droop quotas of voters who rank them at the top |M| positions, then at least k candidates from M are elected. In the special case in which voters vote solely by party, DPC implies proportionality.

PR electoral systems

 Party-based systems 

 Party list PR 

Party list proportional representation is an electoral system in which seats are first allocated to parties based on vote share, and then assigned to party-affiliated candidates on the parties' electoral lists. This system is used in many countries, including Finland (open list), Latvia (open list), Sweden (open list), Israel (national closed list), Brazil (open list), Nepal (closed list) as adopted in 2008 in first CA election, the Netherlands (open list), Russia (closed list), South Africa (closed list), Democratic Republic of the Congo (open list), and Ukraine (open list). For elections to the European Parliament, most member states use open lists; but most large EU countries use closed lists, so that the majority of EP seats are distributed by those. Local lists were used to elect the Italian Senate during the second half of the 20th century. Some common types of electoral lists are:

 Closed list systems, where each party lists its candidates according to the party's candidate selection process. This sets the order of candidates on the list and thus, in effect, their probability of being elected. The first candidate on a list, for example, will get the first seat that party wins. Each voter casts a vote for a list of candidates.  Voters, therefore, do not have the option to express their preferences at the ballot as to which of a party's candidates are elected into office. A party is allocated seats in proportion to the number of votes it receives.
 Ley de Lemas - an intermediate system used in Uruguay, where each party presents several closed lists, each representing a faction. Seats are distributed between parties according to the number of votes, and then between the factions within each party.
 Open list systems, where voters may vote, depending on the model, for one person, or for two, or indicate their order of preference within the list. These votes sometimes rearrange the order of names on the party's list and thus which of its candidates are elected. Nevertheless, the number of candidates elected from the list is determined by the number of votes the list receives.
 Localized list systems, where parties divide their candidates in single member-like constituencies, which are ranked inside each general party list depending by their percentages. This method allows electors to judge every single candidate as in a FPTP system.
 Two-tier party list systems - as in Denmark, Norway, and Sweden. In Denmark, for example, the country is divided into ten multiple-member voting districts arranged in three regions, electing 135 representatives.  In addition, 40 compensatory seats are elected.  Voters have one vote which can be cast for an individual candidate or for a party list on the district ballot.  To determine district winners, candidates are apportioned their share of their party's district list vote plus their individual votes.  The compensatory seats are apportioned to the regions according to the party votes aggregated nationally, and then to the districts where the compensatory representatives are determined. In the 2007 general election, the district magnitudes, including compensatory representatives, varied between 14 and 28.  The basic design of the system has remained unchanged since its introduction in 1920.

 Mixed systems 
There are mixed electoral systems combining a plurality/majority formula with a proportional formula or using the proportional component to compensate for disproportionality caused by the plurality/majority component.

The most prominent mixed compensatory system is mixed member proportional representation (MMP). It combines a single-district vote, usually first-past-the-post, with a compensatory regional or nationwide party list proportional vote. For example, suppose that a party wins 10 seats based on plurality, but requires 15 seats in total to obtain its proportional share of an elected body. A fully proportional mixed compensatory system would award this party 5 compensatory (PR) seats, raising the party's seat count from 10 to 15.  MMP has the potential to produce proportional or moderately proportional election outcomes, depending on a number of factors such as the ratio of FPTP seats to PR seats, the existence or nonexistence of extra compensatory seats to make up for overhang seats, and electoral thresholds. It was invented for the German Bundestag after the Second World War, and has spread to Lesotho, Bolivia, New Zealand and Thailand.  The system is also used for the Welsh Assembly and Scottish Parliament where it is called the additional member system.

Voters typically have two votes, one for their district representative and one for the party list. The list vote usually determines how many seats are allocated to each party in parliament.  After the district winners have been determined, sufficient candidates from each party list are elected to "top-up" each party to the overall number of parliamentary seats due to it according to the party's overall list vote.  Before apportioning list seats, all list votes for parties which failed to reach the threshold are discarded. If eliminated parties lose seats in this manner, then the seat counts for parties that achieved the threshold improve. Any direct seats won by independent candidates are subtracted from the parliamentary total used to apportion list seats.

Proportionality of MMP can be compromised if the ratio of list to district seats is too low, as it may then not be possible to completely compensate district seat disproportionality.  Another factor can be how overhang seats are handled, district seats that a party wins in excess of the number due to it under the list vote.  To achieve proportionality, other parties require "balance seats", increasing the size of parliament by twice the number of overhang seats, but this is not always done.  Until recently, Germany increased the size of parliament by the number of overhang seats but did not use the increased size for apportioning list seats.  This was changed for the 2013 national election after the constitutional court rejected the previous law, not compensating for overhang seats had resulted in a negative vote weight effect.  Lesotho, Scotland and Wales do not increase the size of parliament at all, and, in 2012, a New Zealand parliamentary commission also proposed abandoning compensation for overhang seats, and so fixing the size of parliament.  At the same time, it would abolish the single-seat threshold any such seats would then be overhang seats and would otherwise have increased the size of parliament further and reduce the electoral threshold from 5% to 4%.  Proportionality would not suffer.

Similarly to MMP, mixed single vote systems (MSV) use a proportional formula for allocating seats on the compensatory tier, but voters only have one vote that functions on both levels. MSV may use a positive vote transfer system, where unused votes are transferred from the lower tier to the upper, compensatory tier, where only these are used in the proportional formula. Alternatively, the MMP (seat linkage) algorithm can be used with a mixed single vote to "top-up" to a proportional result. With MSV, the similar requirements as in MMP apply to guarantee an overall proportional result.Parallel voting (MMM) systems use proportional formulas to allocate seats on a proportional tier separately from other tiers. Certain systems, like scorporo use a proportional formula after combining results of a parallel list vote with transferred votes from lower tiers (using negative or positive vote transfer).

Another mixed system is dual-member proportional representation (DMP). It is a single-vote system that elects two representatives in every district. The first seat in each district is awarded to the candidate who wins a plurality of the votes, similar to FPTP voting. The remaining seats are awarded in a compensatory manner to achieve proportionality across a larger region. DMP employs a formula similar to the "best near-winner" variant of MMP used in the German state of Baden-Württemberg. In Baden-Württemberg, compensatory seats are awarded to candidates who receive high levels of support at the district level compared with other candidates of the same party. DMP differs in that at most one candidate per district is permitted to obtain a compensatory seat. If multiple candidates contesting the same district are slated to receive one of their parties' compensatory seats, the candidate with the highest vote share is elected and the others are eliminated. DMP is similar to STV in that all elected representatives, including those who receive compensatory seats, serve their local districts. Invented in 2013 in the Canadian province of Alberta, DMP received attention on Prince Edward Island where it appeared on a 2016 plebiscite as a potential replacement for FPTP, but was eliminated on the third round. It was also one of three proportional voting system options on a 2018 referendum in British Columbia.

 Biproportional apportionment 

Biproportional apportionment aims to achieve proportionality in two dimensions, for example: proportionality by region and proportionality by party. There are several mathematical methods to attain biproportionality.

One method is called iterative proportional fitting (IPF). It was proposed for elections by the mathematician Michel Balinski in 1989, and first used by the city of Zurich for its council elections in February 2006, in a modified form called "new Zurich apportionment" (Neue Zürcher Zuteilungsverfahren).  Zurich had had to modify its party list PR system after the Swiss Federal Court ruled that its smallest wards, as a result of population changes over many years, unconstitutionally disadvantaged smaller political parties.  With biproportional apportionment, the use of open party lists has not changed, but the way winning candidates are determined has.  The proportion of seats due to each party is calculated according to their overall citywide vote, and then the district winners are adjusted to conform to these proportions.  This means that some candidates, who would otherwise have been successful, can be denied seats in favor of initially unsuccessful candidates, in order to improve the relative proportions of their respective parties overall.  This peculiarity is accepted by the Zurich electorate because the resulting city council is proportional and all votes, regardless of district magnitude, now have equal weight.  The system has since been adopted by other Swiss cities and cantons.

Balinski has proposed another variant called fair majority voting' (FMV) to replace single-winner plurality/majoritarian electoral systems, in particular the system used for the US House of Representatives. FMV introduces proportionality without changing the method of voting, the number of seats, or thepossibly gerrymandereddistrict boundaries. Seats would be apportioned to parties in a proportional manner at the state level. In a related proposal for the UK parliament, whose elections are contested by many more parties, the authors note that parameters can be tuned to adopt any degree of proportionality deemed acceptable to the electorate. In order to elect smaller parties, a number of constituencies would be awarded to candidates placed fourth or even fifth in the constituency unlikely to be acceptable to the electorate, the authors concede but this effect could be substantially reduced by incorporating a third, regional, apportionment tier, or by specifying minimum thresholds.

 Candidate-based systems 

 Single transferable vote 

The single transferable vote (STV), also called ranked choice voting, is a ranked system: voters rank candidates in order of preference.  Voting districts usually elect three to seven representatives; each voter casts just one vote.  The count is cyclic, electing or eliminating candidates and transferring votes until all seats are filled.  A candidate whose tally reaches a quota, the minimum vote that guarantees election, is declared elected. The candidate's surplus votes (those in excess of the quota) are transferred to other candidates at a fraction of their value proportionate to the surplus, according to the voters' preferences.  If there are no surplus votes to transfer and there are still seats to fill, the least popular candidate is eliminated, those votes being transferred to their next preference at full value. The votes are transferred according to the next marked preference. Any votes that cannot be transferred are moved to a pile labelled exhausted or non-transferable.

The cont continues until all the seats are filled or until there is only one more candidate than the number of remaining open seats. At that point all of them except the least popular candidate are declared elected, even if they do not have quota.

The transfer of votes of eliminated candidates is simple -- the transfer of surplus votes is more involved. There are various methods for transferring surplus votes. 

Manual methods used in early times and still today in places where STV was adopted in early 20th Century (Ireland and Malta) transfer surplus votes according to a randomly selected sample, or transfer only a segment of the surplus selected based on the next usable marked preference. 

Other more recent methods transfer all votes at a fraction of their value (the fraction derived by the surplus divided by the candidate's tally) and with reference to all the marked preferences on the ballots, not just the next usable preference. They may need the use of a computer. 

The different methods may not produce the same result in all respects. But the front runners in the first count before any transfers are conducted are all or mostly elected in the end, so the various methods of transfers all produce much the same result.

Some variants of STV allow transfers to already elected or eliminated candidates, and these, too, can require a computer.

In effect, the method produces groups of voters of much the same size so the overall effect is to reflect the diversity of the electorate, each substantial group having one or more representatives the group voted for.  

Statistics of effective votes vary.

In Cambridge, under STV, 90 percent of voters see their vote help to elect a candidate, more than 65 percent of voters see their first choice candidate elected, and more than 95 percent of voters see one of their top three choices win.

Other reports claim that 90% of voters have a representative to whom they gave their first preference.  Voters can choose candidates using any criteria they wish, the proportionality is implicit. 

Political parties are not necessary; all other prominent PR electoral systems presume that parties reflect voters wishes, which many believe gives power to parties.  STV satisfies the electoral system criterion proportionality for solid coalitions a solid coalition for a set of candidates is the group of voters that rank all those candidates above all others and is therefore considered a system of proportional representation.  

However, the small district magnitude used in STV elections (usually 5 to 9 seats, but sometimes rising to 21) has been criticized as impairing proportionality, especially when more parties compete than there are seats available, and STV has, for this reason, sometimes been labelled "quasi proportional".  

While this may be true when considering districts in isolation, results  are proportional.  

Even though Ireland has particularly small magnitudes (3 to 5 seats), results of STV elections are "highly proportional".  In 1997, the average magnitude was 4.0 but eight parties gained representation, four of them with less than 3% of first preference votes nationally.  Six independent candidates also won election.  

STV has also been described as the  proportional system as it elects candidates without the need for parties. The influence of parties can distort proportionality.  

The system tends to handicap extreme candidates because, to gain transfers based on back-up preferences and so improve their chance of election, candidates need to canvass voters beyond their own circle of supporters, and so need to moderate their views.  

Conversely, widely respected candidates can win election even if they receive relatively few first preferences. They do this by benefiting from strong subordinate preference support. Of course, they must have enough initial support so that they are not in the bottom rung of popularity or they will be eliminated when the field of candidate is thinned.

 Proportional approval voting 

Systems can be devised that aim at proportional representation but are based on approval votes on individual candidates (not parties). Such is the idea of proportional approval voting (PAV).
When there are a lot of seats to be filled, as in a legislature, counting ballots under PAV may not be feasible, so sequential variants have been used, such as sequential proportional approval voting (SPAV). 

 Sequential proportional approval voting 

Sequential proportional approval voting (SPAV) is a multi-winner voting system similar to STV in that voters can express support for multiple candidates, but different in that candidates are graded instead of ranked. That is, a voter approves or disapproves of each candidate. SPAV was used briefly in Sweden during the early 1900s.

The vote counting procedure occurs in rounds. The first round of SPAV is identical to approval voting. All ballots are added with equal weight, and the candidate with the highest overall score is elected. In all subsequent rounds, ballots that support candidates who have already been elected are added with a reduced weight. Thus voters who support none of the winners in the early rounds are increasingly likely to elect one of their preferred candidates in a later round. The procedure has been shown to yield proportional outcomes especially when voters are loyal to distinct groups of candidates (e.g. political parties).

 Reweighted Range Voting 
Reweighted Range Voting (RRV) uses the same method as sequential proportional approval voting but uses a score ballot. Reweighted Range Voting was used for the nominations in the Visual Effects category for recent Academy Award Oscars from 2013 through 2017, and is used in the city of Berkeley, California, for sorting the priorities of the city council.

 Asset voting 
In asset voting, the voters vote for candidates and then the candidates negotiate amongst each other and reallocate votes amongst themselves. Asset voting was proposed by Lewis Carroll in 1884 and has been more recently independently rediscovered and extended by Warren D. Smith and Forest Simmons. As such, this method substitutes candidates' collective preferences for those of the voters.

 Evaluative Proportional Representation (EPR) 

Similar to Majority Judgment voting that elects single winners, Evaluative Proportional Representation (EPR) elects all the members of a legislative body. Both systems minimize the quantitative and qualitative wasting of votes.   Each citizen grades the fitness for office of as many of the candidates as they wish as either Excellent (ideal), Very Good, Good, Acceptable, Poor, or Reject (entirely unsuitable). Multiple candidates may be given the same grade by a voter.  Using EPR, each citizen elects their representative at-large for a city council.  For a large and diverse state legislature, each citizen chooses to vote through any of the districts or official non-geographically defined electoral associations in the country. Each voter grades any number of candidates in the whole country.  Each elected representative has a different voting power (a different number of weighted votes) in the legislative body. This number is equal to the total number of votes given exclusively to each member from all citizens. Each member's weighted vote results from receiving one of the following from each voter: their highest grade, highest remaining grade, or proxy vote.  No citizen's vote is "wasted" because each citizen's vote equally adds to the voting power in the legislative body of the elected candidate they see as likely to represent their hopes and concerns most accurately. Unlike all the other proportional representation systems, each EPR voter, and each self-identifying minority or majority, is proportionally represented exactly.  Also, like Majority Judgment, EPR reduces by almost half both the incentives and possibilities for voters to use Tactical Voting. 

 History 
One of the earliest proposals of proportionality in an assembly was by John Adams in his influential pamphlet Thoughts on Government, written in 1776 during the American Revolution:

Mirabeau, speaking to the Assembly of Provence on January 30, 1789, was also an early proponent of a proportionally representative assembly: 

In February 1793, the Marquis de Condorcet led the drafting of the Girondist constitution which proposed a limited voting scheme with proportional aspects. Before that could be voted on, the Montagnards took over the National Convention and produced their own constitution.  On June 24, Saint-Just proposed the single non-transferable vote, which can be proportional, for national elections but the constitution was passed on the same day specifying first-past-the-post voting.

Already in 1787, James Wilson, like Adams a US Founding Father, understood the importance of multiple-member districts: "Bad elections proceed from the smallness of the districts which give an opportunity to bad men to intrigue themselves into office", and again, in 1791, in his Lectures on Law: "It may, I believe, be assumed as a general maxim, of no small importance in democratical governments, that the more extensive the district of election is, the choice will be the more wise and enlightened".  The 1790 Constitution of Pennsylvania specified multiple-member districts for the state Senate and required their boundaries to follow county lines.

STV or more precisely, an election method where voters have one transferable vote, was first invented in 1819 by an English schoolmaster, Thomas Wright Hill, who devised a "plan of election" for the committee of the Society for Literary and Scientific Improvement in Birmingham that used not only transfers of surplus votes from winners but also from losers, a refinement that later both Andræ and Hare initially omitted.  But the procedure was unsuitable for a public election and was not publicised.  In 1839, Hill's son, Rowland Hill, recommended the concept for public elections in Adelaide, and a simple process was used in which voters formed as many groups as there were representatives to be elected, each group electing one representative.

The first practical PR election method, the List Plan system, was conceived by Thomas Gilpin, a retired paper-mill owner, in a paper he read to the American Philosophical Society in Philadelphia in 1844: "On the representation of minorities of electors to act with the majority in elected assemblies". It was never put into practical use, but even as late as 1914 it was put forward as a way to elect the U.S. electoral college delegates and for local elections.Hoag, Effective Voting (1914), p. 31

A practical election using the Single Transferable Vote system (a combination of preferential voting and multi-member districts) was devised in Denmark by Carl Andræ, a mathematician, and first used there in 1855, making it the oldest PR system. That system was later adopted for national elections in Malta (1921), the Republic of Ireland (1921) and Australia (1948).

STV was also invented (apparently independently) in the UK in 1857 by Thomas Hare, a London barrister, in his pamphlet The Machinery of Representation and expanded on in his 1859 Treatise on the Election of Representatives.  The scheme was enthusiastically taken up by John Stuart Mill, ensuring international interest.  The 1865 edition of the book included the transfer of preferences from dropped candidates and the STV method was essentially complete, although Hare pictured the entire British Isles as one single district.  Mill proposed it to the House of Commons in 1867, but the British parliament rejected it.  The name evolved from "Mr.Hare's scheme" to "proportional representation", then "proportional representation with the single transferable vote", and finally, by the end of the 19th century, to "the single transferable vote".

In Australia, the political activist Catherine Helen Spence became an enthusiast of STV and an author on the subject. Through her influence and the efforts of the Tasmanian politician Andrew Inglis Clark, Tasmania became an early pioneer of the system, electing the world's first legislators through STV in 1896, prior to its federation into Australia.

A party-list proportional representation system was devised and described in 1878 by Victor D'Hondt in Belgium, which became the first country to adopt list PR in 1900 for its national parliament. D'Hondt's method of seat allocation, the D'Hondt method, is still widely used. Some Swiss cantons (beginning with Ticino in 1890) used the system before Belgium. Victor Considerant, a utopian socialist, devised a similar system in an 1892 book. Many European countries adopted similar systems during or after World War I.  List PR was favoured on the Continent because the use of lists in elections, the scrutin de liste, was already widespread.  STV was preferred in the English-speaking world because its tradition was the election of individuals.

In the UK, the 1917 Speaker's Conference recommended STV for all multi-seat Westminster constituencies, but it was only applied to university constituencies, lasting from 1918 until 1950 when those constituencies were abolished.

In Ireland, STV was used in 1918 in the Dublin University constituency, and was introduced for devolved elections in 1921.

STV is currently used for two national lower houses of parliament, Ireland, since independence (as the Irish Free State) in 1922, and Malta, since 1921, long before independence in 1966.
In Ireland, two attempts were made by Fianna Fáil governments to abolish STV and replace it with the 'First Past the Post' plurality system. Both attempts were rejected by voters in referendums held in 1959 and again in 1968.
STV is also prescribed for all other elections in Ireland including that of the presidency, although it is there effectively the alternative vote, as it is an election with a single winner.

It is also used for the Northern Ireland Assembly and European and local authorities, Scottish local authorities, some New Zealand and Australian local authorities, the Tasmanian (since 1907) and Australian Capital Territory assemblies, where the method is known as Hare-Clark, and the city council in Cambridge, Massachusetts, (since 1941).

PR is used by a majority of the world's 33 most robust democracies with populations of at least two million people; only six use plurality or a majoritarian system (runoff or instant runoff) for elections to the legislative assembly, four use parallel systems, and 23 use PR. PR dominates Europe, including Germany and most of northern and eastern Europe; it is also used for European Parliament elections. France adopted PR at the end of World War II, but discarded it in 1958; it was used for parliament elections in 1986. Switzerland has the most widespread use of proportional representation, which is the system used to elect not only national legislatures and local councils, but also all local executives. PR is less common in the English-speaking world; Malta and Ireland use STV for election of legislators. Australia uses it for Senate elections. New Zealand adopted MMP in 1993. But UK, Canada and India use plurality (First Past the Post) systems for legislative elections. In Canada, STV was used to elect provincial legislators in Alberta from 1926 to 1955, and in Manitoba from 1920 to 1953.  In both provinces the alternative vote (AV) was used in rural areas. First-past-the-post was re-adopted in Alberta by the dominant party for reasons of political advantage. In Manitoba a principal reason was the underrepresentation of Winnipeg in the provincial legislature.

STV has some history in the United States. Between 1915 and 1962, twenty-four cities used the system for at least one election. In many cities, minority parties and other groups used STV to break up single-party monopolies on elective office. One of the most famous cases is New York City, where a coalition of Republicans and others pursued the adoption of STV in 1936 as part of an effort to free the city from control by the Tammany Hall machine. Another famous case is Cincinnati, Ohio, where, in 1924, Democrats and Progressive-wing Republicans secured the adoption of a council-manager charter with STV elections in order to dislodge the Republican machine of Rudolph K. Hynicka. Although Cincinnati's council-manager system survives, Republicans and other disaffected groups replaced STV with plurality-at-large voting in 1957. From 1870 to 1980, Illinois used a semi-proportional cumulative voting system to elect its House of Representatives. Each district across the state elected both Republicans and Democrats year-after-year.

Cambridge, Massachusetts (STV), and Peoria, Illinois (cumulative voting), have used PR for many years now.

San Francisco (before 1977 and 1980–1999) had citywide elections in which people cast votes for as many as nine candidates, but usually five or six candidates, simultaneously (block voting), delivering some of the benefits of proportional representation through the use of a multi-member district. San Francisco used preferential voting (Bucklin Voting) in its 1917 city election.

 List of countries using proportional representation 

Eighty-five countries in the world use a proportional electoral system to fill a nationally elected legislative body. 

The table below lists those countries and gives information on the specific PR system that is in use.

Detailed information on electoral systems applying to the first chamber of the legislature is maintained by the ACE Electoral Knowledge Network. Countries using PR as part of a mixed-member majoritarian (e.g. parallel voting) system are not included.

Incentives for choosing an electoral system
Changing the electoral system requires the agreement of a majority of the currently selected legislators, who were chosen using the incumbent electoral system. Therefore, an interesting question is what incentives make current legislators support a new electoral system, particularly a PR system.

Many political scientists argue that PR was adopted by parties on the right as a strategy to survive amid suffrage expansion, democratization and the rise of workers' parties. According to Stein Rokkan in a seminal 1970 study, parties on the right opted to adopt PR as a way to survive as competitive parties in situations when the parties on the right were not united enough to exist under majoritarian systems. This argument was formalized and supported by Carles Boix in a 1999 study. Amel Ahmed notes that prior to the adoption of PR, many electoral systems were based on majority or plurality rule, and that these systems risked eradicating parties on the right in areas where the working class was large in numbers. He therefore argues that parties on the right adopted PR as a way to ensure that they would survive as potent political forces amid suffrage expansion. A 2021 study linked the adoption of PR to incumbent fears of revolutionary threats.

In contrast, other scholars argue that the choice to adopt PR was also due to a demand by parties on the left to ensure a foothold in politics, as well as to encourage a consensual system that would help the left realize its preferred economic policies.

See also
 Condorcet paradox
 Direct representation
 Electoral threshold
 First-past-the-post voting
Hare quota
 Interactive representation
 Justified representation, a generalization of the principle of proportionality to multiwinner approval voting.
 One person, one vote
Sainte-Laguë method
Spare vote
Two-round system

References

Further reading
Books

 Abbott, Lewis F. British Democracy: Its Restoration and Extension. ISR/Kindle Books, 2019. . Chapter 7, "Electoral System Reform: Increasing Competition and Voter Choice and Influence".
 
 
 Batto, Nathan F.; Huang, Chi; Tan, Alexander C.; Cox, Gary (2016). Mixed-Member Electoral Systems in Constitutional Context: Taiwan, Japan, and Beyond.'' Ann Arbor: University of Michigan Press.
 
 
 
 
 
 
Jenifer Hart, Proportional Representation: Critics of the British Electoral System,1820-1945 (Clarendon Press, 1992)
F.D. Parsons, Thomas Hare and Political Representation in Victorian Britain (Palgrave Macmillan, 2009)

Journals

External links
 The De Borda Institute A Northern Ireland-based organisation promoting inclusive voting procedures
 Election Districts Voting improves PR with overlapping districts elections for first past the post, alternative vote and single transferable vote voters
 Electoral Reform Society founded in England in 1884, the longest running PR organization. Contains good information about single transferable vote the Society's preferred form of PR
 Electoral Reform Australia
 Proportional Representation Society of Australia
 Fair Vote Canada
 FairVote, USA
 Why Not Proportional Representation?
 Vote Dilution means Voters have Less Voice Law is Cool site
 Proportional Representation and British Democracy Debate on British electoral system reform
 RangeVoting.org. page on PR
 Australia's Upper Houses - ABC Rear Vision A podcast about the development of Australia's upper houses into STV proportional representation elected chambers.